Beyond White Space is a 2018 American-Hungarian science fiction thriller film directed by Ken Locsmandi and starring Holt McCallany about the crew of a commercial vessel at the edge of uncharted space who encounter a rare and valuable alien creature, and the captain intent to capture it.

Cast
Holt McCallany
Zulay Henao
James Devoti
Jocko Sims
Kodi Kitchen
Dave Sheridan
Mike Genovese
Tiffany Brouwer
Isaac C. Singleton Jr.

Plot Summary
The USS Essex is travelling in the furthest reaches of the known Universe when it encounters a gigantic creature. After pirates steal their cargo and most of their supplies the captain decides to capture the creature. The creature is a rare and nearly extinct species and the captain soon becomes obsessed with succeeding in its capture. The crew of the ship becomes mutinous, and soon after the gigantic and deadly creature attacks the ship.

Release
Vertical Entertainment acquired North American distribution rights to the film in September 2018.  The film was released in limited theaters and on VOD on December 14, 2018.

Reception
The Hollywood Reporter gave the film a negative review, calling it "Good-looking but dimwitted sci-fi."

References

External links
 
 

American science fiction thriller films
Hungarian science fiction thriller films
English-language Hungarian films
2018 science fiction films
2018 thriller films
Films set on spacecraft
Vertical Entertainment films
2010s English-language films
2010s science fiction thriller films
2010s American films